The Priestley 11 are eleven law subjects required to be successfully completed for candidate status for admission into practice as a legal practitioner in Australia. They are named after the Law Admissions Consultative Committee (LACC, commonly known as the Priestley Committee as it was chaired by Lancelot John Priestley) which in 1992 determined the minimum academic study requirements for legal practice.  The Priestley 11 list is set out in LACC, Uniform Admission Rules 2015, Schedule 1.  A law degree or diploma will be recognised as a qualification for admission to practice only if every student has to study all of these subjects.  However, the subjects do not have to be taught separately:  it is sufficient if they are covered within the syllabus.

Priestley 11 subjects"Prescribed Areas of Knowledge"
 Administrative Law
 Civil Procedure
 Company Law
 Contracts
 Criminal Law and Procedure
 Equity (including Trusts)
 Ethics and Professional Responsibility
 Evidence
 Federal and State Constitutional Law
 Property
 Torts

Places offering Priestley 11

Every law school in Australia has a prescribed course of study that involves the Priestley 11. Laws schools need not make them discrete subjects unto themselves, (eg, the law school can integrate one or more subjections within other subjects offered, or they may offer the subjects under the header of a different name, or they may even split a mandatory Priestley 11 subject into two or three subjects).

Notes

External links
Law Admissions Consultative Committee, Uniform Admission Rules 2008 Schedule 1 (pp. 5–11) "Prescribed Areas of Knowledge".  Retrieved 23 July 2013.
Council of Legal Education (Victoria), Admission Requirements.  Retrieved 23 July 2013.

Legal education in Australia
Professional certification in law